Bhitarwar is a city and a Municipality in Gwalior district in the state of Madhya Pradesh, India. The town is surrounded by a river called Parbati.

As of 2011, the population of Bhitarwar town is 19,096, in 3,422 households.

Bhitarwar is the headquarters of a tehsil, vidhansabha, as well as a community development block. The block is divided between the tehsils of Bhitarwar and Chinour; Chinour tehsil was created out of Bhitarwar tehsil in 2008.

Geography
It has an average elevation of 227 metres (745 feet).

History
Earliest maintain of this city found place in the writings of Bhavbhuti as padmapawaya which was situated on the river para(modern parbati ) and chandrabhaga (modern sindh ). 
Padmapawaya was ancient capital of Naga dynasty and it had also relationships with guptas . 
Current pawaya village is situated in east direction (7 km radius) from modern town. 
Modern Bhitarwar was founded by Hindu king Raja rao bahoran in early 18th century, but later captured by maratha kings of Gwalior (scindia ) in a small clash.
Afghans has important roll in this war The 18th-century Jesuit missionary Joseph Tiefenthaler noted that Bhitarwar had a stone fort which was built by a Jat chief in the 16th century . By the early 20th century, Bhitarwar was the seat of the pargana of Mastura. It was hit hard by the Indian famine of 1899-1900, and many people died. Early-20th-century Bhitarwar had a post office run by Gwalior State, a police station, and a small, poorly-maintained fort. The 1901 census recorded its population as 1,530 people (815 male and 715 female).

Demographics
 India census, Bhitarwar had a population of 25,670. Males constitute 54% of the population and females 46%. Bhitarwar has an average literacy rate of 74%, higher than the national average of 59.5%; with male literacy of 82% and female literacy of 64%. 17% of the population is under 6 years of age.

Transportation
Bhitarwar is situated on Dabra - satanwada state highway and connected to all nearby cities by road.
Nearest railway station is in Dabra, and major railway junction is Gwalior which is around 72 km away from the town and jhansi 75 km . 
Nearest airport is Rajmata vijyaraje Scindia airport Gwalior.
There is no hope for railway line to this town

Economy
Economy of the city is based on agriculture.
The main crop of this area is wheat, rice and sugarcane, there is a sugar factory in this city.
Other than this cottage industries also found place in the town.

Bricks are the most important manufactured goods produced in Bhitarwar.
Red marble and mika also found in this area

Tourist attractions
There is many places of interest in the town like Dhumeswar, Lakheswari and Diyadah. 
Around 15 km away is an ancient city called Padma Pavaya. 
Goleswar temple is another place for visit in the city.
There is a small fort in the old bhitarwar city which has need to be restoration.
Some parks are also build by the govt in the town are lakhmibai park, laxamangarh park Harsi dam etc.

List of villages
Bhitarwar block contains 165 rural villages, split between the tehsils of Bhitarwar and Chinour. As of 2011, the total population of these villages is 182,935, in 35,545 households. The villages are as follows:

References

Cities and towns in Gwalior district